Masquerade was written in 1941 by Aram Khachaturian as incidental music for a production of the play of the same name by Russian poet and playwright Mikhail Lermontov. The music is better known in the form of a five-movement suite.

Background
Khachaturian was asked to write music for a production of Masquerade being produced by the director Ruben Simonov. The famous waltz theme in particular gave Khachaturian much trouble in its creation: moved by the words of the play's heroine, Nina – "How beautiful the new waltz is! ... something between sorrow and joy gripped my heart." – the composer struggled to "find a theme that I considered beautiful and new". His former teacher, Nikolai Myaskovsky, attempted to help Khachaturian by giving him a collection of romances and waltzes from Lermontov's time; though these did not give immediate inspiration, Khachaturian admitted that "had it not been for the strenuous search" for the appropriate style and melodic inspiration, he would not have discovered the second theme of his waltz which acted "like a magic link, allowing me to pull out the whole chain. The rest of the waltz came to me easily, with no trouble at all." Khachaturian dedicated the waltz to the actress who played Nina, Alla Kazanskaya.

Masquerade premiered on 21 June 1941 in the Vakhtangov Theatre in Moscow, directed Andrei Tutyshkin and starring Iosif Tolchanov as Arbenin and Alla Kazanskaya as Nina.  On the following day Germany invaded the Soviet Union and its production run was cut short. On 23 July 1941 German air-bombing completely destroyed the Vakhtangov Theatre, killing many actors and personnel, and destroying the elaborate stage decorations. Tutyshkin continued successful performances of Masquerade while in evacuation in Siberia.

Suite
Later, in 1944, Khachaturian extracted five movements to make a symphonic suite. The movements are: 
 Waltz
 Nocturne
 Mazurka
 Romance
 Galop

Recordings
In 1954, Khachaturian recorded the Waltz, Nocturne, and Mazurka from the Suite, conducting the Philharmonia Orchestra for Columbia (also setting down some of his other scores in the same sessions).
 1958, RCA Victor Symphony Orchestra, Kirill Kondrashin (CD), RCA 09026 63302 2 
 1985, Complete Ballet on film; release on DVD in 2007, VAI 4515.
 1992, Scottish National Orchestra, Neeme Järvi (CD), Chandos 8542
 2008, Armenian Philharmonic Orchestra, Loris Tjeknavorian (CD), ASV CDDCA 773

References

 Yuzefovich, Victor. Aram Khachaturyan, trans. Nicholas Kournokoff and Vladimir Bobrov.  New York, Sphinx Press, 1985.  

zh-yue:面具舞會組曲
Armenian music
Incidental music
Compositions by Aram Khachaturian
Orchestral suites
1941 compositions